The 1958–59 season of the Moroccan Throne Cup was the third edition of the competition.

The teams played a one-legged match. In case of a draw, the matches were replayed at the opponent's ground.

FAR de Rabat beat Mouloudia Club d'Oujda 1–0 in the final, played at the Stade d'honneur in Casablanca. FAR de Rabat won the competition for the first time in their history.

Competition 

The final took place between the winners of the two semi-finals, FAR de Rabat and Mouloudia Club d'Oujda, on 16 November 1957 at the Stade d'honneur in Casablanca. The match was refereed by Abdelkrim Ziani. It was the third consecutive final for MC Oujda in the competition. FAR de Rabat won the competition for the first time in their history thanks to a goal from Houcine Zemmouri.

Notes and references

Sources 
 Rsssf.com

1958
1958 in association football
1959 in association football
1958–59 in Moroccan football